The Rumely Oil Pull was a line of farm tractors developed by Advance-Rumely Company from 1909 and sold 1910 to 1930. Most were heavy tractors powered by an internal combustion,  magneto fired engine designed to burn all kerosene grades at any load, called the Oil Turn.

A popular model, the Type F, had a single cylinder of 10" bore and a 12" stroke.  It was started by the operator stepping out of the cab via the large iron rear wheel, climbing onto the flywheel and using his bodyweight to get it turning, then quickly rushing back into the cab to adjust the choke and try to keep the engine running.

Models

Heavy Weights
Kerosene Annie
Rumely Model "B" Prototype. Only one remains. It is currently on display in Boise, Idaho.
Model "B" 25-45
1910 Serial# 1 - 100
1911 Serial# 2,101 - 2,269
1912 Serial# 2,270 - 2,936
Model "E" 30-60
1910 Serial#	101 -	236
1911 Serial#	237 -	746
1912 Serial#	747 -	1,678
1913 Serial#	1,679 -	1,787
1914 Serial#	None	Built
1915 Serial#	1,819 -	2,018
1916 Serial#	2,019 -	2,100
1917 Serial#	2,997 -	8,724
1918 Serial#	8,725 -	8,902
1919 Serial#	11,500 -	11,596
1920 Serial#	2,252 -	2,351
1921 Serial#	2,352 -	2,402
1922 Serial#	2,404 -	2,453
1923 Serial#	2,454 -	2,503
Model "S" 30-60
1924 Serial#	 1-4
1925 Serial#	 5-34
1926 Serial#	 35-234
1927 Serial#	 235-434
1928 Serial#	 435-514
Model "Y" 30-50
1929 Serial#    1-45	
Model "Z" 40-70
1929 Serial#    1-215

References

External Links
 Information at tractordata.com

Tractors
Allis-Chalmers Manufacturing Company